David Robie (born 1945) is a New Zealand author, journalist and media educator who has covered the Asia-Pacific region for international media for more than two decades. Robie is the author of several books on South Pacific media and politics and is an advocate for media freedom in the pacific region.

In 1985, Robie sailed on board the Greenpeace eco-navy flagship Rainbow Warrior for 10 weeks until it was bombed by French secret agents in New Zealand’s Auckland harbour. He is the author of a book about the ill-fated voyage, Eyes of Fire: The Last Voyage of the Rainbow Warrior (Lindon Books, 1986). An updated memorial edition of Eyes of Fire was published in July 2005, and a 30th anniversary edition in July 2015 (Little Island Press).

In 1993-1997, Robie headed the University of Papua New Guinea journalism programme and in 1998-2002 became coordinator of the University of the South Pacific journalism school where his students covered the 2000 George Speight coup d'état in Fiji. According to the NZ Listener,  an assistant minister in Fiji Prime Minister Sitiveni Rabuka's government in 1998 threatened to close Robie's media and politics website - Café Pacific - and revoke his work permit as a media educator in "what was seen as the first test of the 1997 Constitution's freedom of expression clause". In 1999, Robie became an annual Australian Press Council Fellow. He is founding editor of Pacific Journalism Review, launched at the University of Papua New Guinea in 1994. Between 1998-2002, Robie was the Head of Journalism at the University of the South Pacific. He became an associate professor in Auckland University of Technology School of Communication Studies in 2005 and a professor in 2011. In 2020 he retired as director of the Pacific Media Centre.

Awards 
1985: NZ Media Prize, for coverage of the Rainbow Warrior bombing

1989: Qantas Press Awards for best feature article

2005: PIMA Pacific Media Freedom Award. 

2015: AMIC Asia Communication Award.

Publications
Robie's publications include:
 Robie, David (2015) "Eyes of Fire: The Last Voyage of the Rainbow Warrior" (30th anniversary edition) 
 Robie, David (2014) "Don't Spoil My Beautiful Face: Media, Mayhem and Human Rights in the Pacific" 
 Robie, David (2005) Eyes of Fire: The Last Voyage of the Rainbow Warrior (memorial edition) 
 Robie, David (2004) Mekim Nius: South Pacific media, politics and education. 
 Robie, David (ed.) (2001) The Pacific Journalist: A Practical Guide 
 Robie, David (ed.) (1995) Nius Bilong Pasifik: Mass Media in the Pacific 
 Robie, David (ed.) (1992) Tu Galala: Social Change in the Pacific  
 Robie, David (1989) Och världen blundar... Kampen för frihet i Stilla Havet (translated into Swedish by Margareta Eklof, Sweden) 
 Robie, David (1989) Blood on their Banner: Nationalist Struggles in the South Pacific 
 Robie, David (1987) Eyes of Fire: The Last Voyage of the Rainbow Warrior (New Society Publishers edition, USA) 
 Robie, David (1986)  Eyes of Fire: The Last Voyage of the Rainbow Warrior (Lindon, NZ)

References

External links
David Robie AUT University staff profile
Cafe Pacific blog
Asia-Pacific Network portal
Pacific Scoop
Pacific Media Centre
"Young and brave: In Pacific island paradise, journalism students cover a strange coup attempt for course credit." - IPI Global Journalist, September 2000

1945 births
Academic staff of the Auckland University of Technology
Living people
New Zealand journalists
People associated with Greenpeace
New Zealand investigative journalists
Academic staff of the University of Papua New Guinea